Bhagabangola Assembly constituency is an assembly constituency in Murshidabad district in the Indian state of West Bengal.

Overview
As per orders of the Delimitation Commission, No. 62 Bhagwangola Assembly constituency covers Bhagwangola II  community development block and Bhagwangola, Habaspur, Hanumantanagar, Kuthirampur, Mahammadpur, Mahisasthali and Sundarpur gram panchayats of Bhagwangola I CD Block.

Bhagwangola Assembly constituency is part of No. 11 Murshidabad (Lok Sabha constituency).

Members of Legislative Assembly

Election results

2021
In the 2021 election, Idris Ali of Trinamool Congress defeated his nearest rival, Md. Kamal Hossain of CPI (M).

2016
In the 2016 election, Mahasin Ali of CPI (M) defeated his nearest rival, Abu Sufian Sarkar of Trinamool Congress.

.# Swing calculated on LF+Congress vote percentages taken together in 2016. Chand Mohammad was the SP candidate in 2011.

2011
In the 2011 election, Chand Mohammad of Samajwadi Party defeated his nearest rival Sagir Hossain of Trinamool Congress.

Syed Alamgir, a rebel Congress candidate contesting as an independent, was suspended from the party, but Adhir Chowdhury, the Baharampur MP continued to extend support to him.

.# Swing calculated on Congress+Trinamool Congress vote percentages taken together in 2006. Chand Mohammad was the WBSP candidate in 2006.

1977–2006
In the 2006 state assembly elections, Chand Mohammad of WBSP won the 62 Bhagabangola assembly seat defeating his nearest rival Abu Sufian Sarkar of Congress. Contests in most years were multi cornered but only winners and runners are being mentioned. Mojibor Rahaman of WBSP defeated Abu Sufian Sarkar of Congress in 2001. Abu Sufian Sarkar of Congress defeated Syed Nawabjani Meerza of CPI(M) in 1996. Syed Nawabjani Meerza of CPI(M)/Independent defeated Islam Nazrul of Congress in 1991 and Mojibur Rahaman of Congress in 1987. Kazi Hafizur Rahman of Congress/ Independent defeated Sailen Adhicary, Independent, in 1982 and Sheikh Kazimuddin of CPI(M) in 1977.

1957–1972
Mohammad Dedar Baksh of Congress won in 1972. Md. Samaun Biswas, Independent, won in 1971. Sailendra Nath Adhicary of SSP won in 1969. S. Bhattacharyya of Congress won in 1967. Sailendra Nath Adhicary of PSP won in 1962. Hafizur Rehman Kazi of Congress won in 1957.

References

Assembly constituencies of West Bengal
Politics of Murshidabad district